Takk may refer to:

 Takk..., a 2005 album by Icelandic band Sigur Rós
 Tank, Pakistan, a city in the Khyber Pakhtunkhwa Province
Takk, a 2002 poetry collection by Gunnar Wærness
Takkarist McKinley (born 1995), American football player

See also 
 Tak (disambiguation)